The Church St. George, Kumanovo (Macedonian Cyrillic: Црква Свети Ѓорѓи, Куманово) is a church in the city of Kumanovo, North Macedonia. The church was built in 2006 near the city cemetery.

See also
Kumanovo
Macedonian Orthodox Church – Ohrid Archbishopric

References

Churches in Kumanovo
Churches completed in 2006
Macedonian Orthodox churches